Carigara Bay, is a large bay in the northern part of Leyte in the Philippines. The bay is bounded by Leyte to its western, southern and eastern parts and the island of Biliran to the northwest. It is named after the municipality of Carigara.

References

Bays of the Philippines
Landforms of Leyte (province)